The former Western State of Nigeria was formed in 1967 when the Western Region was subdivided into the states of Lagos and Western State. Its capital was Ibadan, which was the capital of the old region. These states make up majority ethnic Yoruba states.
	
In 1976, the state was subdivided into three new states, Ogun, Ondo and Oyo. The region now consist of nine states, across three geopolitical zones: Delta, Edo, Ekiti, Kwara, Lagos, Ogun, Ondo, Osun, and Oyo States.

Oyo State is the largest state in South West. It covers an area of 28,454km2.

Lagos can be said to be the most prominent state with over 20 million people residing therein.

See also
18-1900s Yoruba country

References

Further reading

 
Former Nigerian administrative divisions
States and territories established in 1967